Marcos Diniz Daniel (born July 4, 1978 in Passo Fundo, Rio Grande do Sul) is a retired professional tennis player from Brazil who turned professional in 1997. The right-hander reached his highest ATP singles ranking of World No. 56 in September 2009. He is coached by his brother, Márcio.

Tennis career
Marcos Daniel's brother owns an academy for developing young tennis players, called Daniel Tennis Center where Marcos Daniel used to work as a ball catcher. He started playing youth tournaments at age 5. When he was 12, representing this academy, he reached his first final but he did not succeed in winning the title.

In August 2009, he reached the semi-finals of the ATP Gstaad tournament. He also reached the semi-finals there in 2006.

He qualified for the 2009 French Open and lost in the first round to Rafael Nadal after giving a strong performance, 5–7, 4–6, 3–6.

ATP Challenger and ITF Futures finals

Singles: 36 (22–14)

Doubles: 23 (11–12)

Performance timeline

Singles

References

External links
 
 
 Daniel Recent Match Results
 Daniel World Ranking History
 Daniel Tennis Center site

Living people
1978 births
Brazilian male tennis players
Olympic tennis players of Brazil
People from Passo Fundo
Tennis players at the 2008 Summer Olympics
Tennis players at the 2007 Pan American Games
Pan American Games competitors for Brazil
Sportspeople from Rio Grande do Sul